This list contains all cultural property of national significance (class A) in the canton of Basel-Stadt from the 2009 Swiss Inventory of Cultural Property of National and Regional Significance. It is sorted by municipality and contains 70 individual buildings, 32 collections and 3 archaeological finds.

The geographic coordinates provided are in the Swiss coordinate system as given in the Inventory.

Basel

Bettingen

Riehen

References
 All entries, addresses and coordinates are from:

External links
 Swiss Inventory of Cultural Property of National and Regional Significance, 2009 edition:

PDF documents: Class B objects
Geographic information system